Touch and Go is a 1980 Australian heist film directed by Peter Maxwell and starring Wendy Hughes. The film also stars musician Jon English, who also composes music for the film.

Plot synopsis
In this Robin Hood-esque caper, Eva, Fiona and Millicent all plan a heist together for a charitable cause.

Cast
Wendy Hughes as Eva
Chantal Contouri as Fiona
Jon English as Frank Butterfield
Carmen Duncan as Millicent
Jeanie Drynan as Gina
Liddy Clark as Helen
John Bluthal as Anatole
Christine Amor as Sue

Production
The film was the idea of director Peter Maxwell. It was originally intended to be set on Hayman Island but Reg Ansett, who had interests on the island at the time, was not keen on showing a robbery on the island.

It was made with funding from Greater Union, the Queensland Film Corporation and Australian Film Commission.

Shooting began in November 1979 with a month's worth of filming at Maroochydore and Noose Heads, and eight weeks of night shooting in Sydney. Scenes set in a Barrier Reef island were shot at a Maroochydore hotel. Its original shooting title was Friday the 13th but this was changed when the horror movie with the same name came out.

Release
The film only ran for three weeks in a cinema in Brisbane.

References

External links
 
 Touch and Go at Oz Movies

1980 films
1980s crime comedy films
1980s heist films
Films directed by Peter Maxwell
Australian heist films
Australian crime comedy films
1980 comedy films
1980s English-language films
1980s Australian films